Dindigul Sarathy is a 2008 Indian Tamil language drama film directed by Siva Sanmukam, who earlier directed Thagapansamy. The film stars Karunas, Karthika, and Saranya Ponvannan, while Nassar, M. S. Baskar, Livingston, and Chitti Babu play supporting roles. The film has cinematography by S. Thaj and music by Dhina. The film released on 19 December 2008. It is a remake of the Malayalam film Vadakkunokkiyantram (1989).

Plot
The story revolves around an insecure teetotaler named Sarathy (Karunas), who feels bad due to his dark skin (his wife Vasanthi (Karthika) is fairer than him), which is often the butt of many jokes. Because Sarathy feels inferior to Vasanthi, he begins to suspect her of infidelity and thinks that she will one day elope with a lover. After a misunderstanding, Sarathy and his mother Saradha (Saranya) are estranged, which further weakens the bond between him and Vasanthi. How Sarathy resolves his issues and gets back together with Vasanthi forms the rest of the story.

Cast

Soundtrack
The soundtrack was composed by Dhina.

Critical reception
Behindwoods noted "Overall, Dindigul Sarathy is a product that comes out only once. Its distinctness is its defining strength, but it has got its commercial limitations at the box office". Indiaglitz noted "Due credit should be given to director Shivashanmugham, who has made necessary changes in the script to suit the Tamil audience. Though the first half has shades of the original, the latter half is different and oozes with nativity". Hindu wrote "Borrowed from a Malayalam film, director Sivashanmugan makes a few small and suitable changes to the storyline for his Tamil venture".

References

2008 films
2000s Tamil-language films
Tamil remakes of Malayalam films